Metamorphosis is a 2019 South Korean horror thriller film directed by , starring Bae Seong-woo, Sung Dong-il and Jang Young-nam.

Cast
 Bae Seong-woo as Joong-soo
 Sung Dong-il as Gang-goo
 Jang Young-nam as Myung-joo
 Kim Hye-jun as Sun-woo
 Cho Yi-hyun as Park Hyeon-ju
 Kim Kang-hoon as Woo-jong
 Jeon Mi-do as Girl's mother
 Kim Se-hee as Girl
 Kim Kwi-seon as Father Dean
 Ji Dae-han as Jacob
 Baek Yoon-sik as Balthazar
 Ronnie Henares as Filipino Priest 1
 Joel Saracho as Filipino Priest 2
 Archi Adamos as Filipino Priest 3
 Stephanie Henares as Filipino Garden Nun
  as Provost
 Jef Flores as Balthazar Auxiliary Priest 1
 Nico Locco as Balthazar Auxiliary Priest 2
  as Elder Filipino Nun

Release
The film was released in South Korea on 21 August 2019.

Reception
William Schwartz of HanCinema wrote that while the film is "not particularly original", it "makes the smart decision to portray the spirit as a fairly mundane problem which exorcists deal with the same way a plumber might deal with a clogged pipe", and called the tension "absolutely superb" and the imagery "disturbing yet distinctly the work of a mortal hand, which makes it all the creepier."

Douglas Tseng of today rated the film 3 stars out of 5 and wrote that while the film "doesn't break new ground", Kim "draws strong performances from his ensemble and keeps the mood sombre and tense, especially in the jumpy middle section where the unholy entity sows the seeds of discord and destruction by taking turns to mimic each family member."

Patrick Brennan of Dread Central rated the film 2 stars out of 5 and wrote that while it is "visually inventive at times", it "ultimately feels far too familiar to standout from the rest of the exorcism entries in horror today."

References

External links
 
 

South Korean horror thriller films
2019 horror thriller films